Liga Deportiva Universitaria de Quito's 1970 season was the club's 40th year of existence, the 17th year in professional football, and the 11th in the top level of professional football in Ecuador.

Squad

Competitions

Serie A

First stage

Results

Liguilla Final

Results

Copa Libertadores

First stage

Second phase

External links

RSSSF - 1970 Serie A 

1970